Conasprella kitteredgei is a species of fossil sea snail, a marine gastropod mollusk in the family Conidae, the cone snails, cone shells or cones.

Distribution
This fossil species is known from the Neogene of the Dominican Republic.

References

  Hendricks J.R. (2015). Glowing seashells: diversity of fossilized coloration patterns on coral reef-associated cone snail (Gastropoda: Conidae) shells from the Neogene of the Dominican Republic. PLoS ONE. 10(4): e0120924

External links
 World Register of Marine Species

kitteredgei
Fossil taxa described in 1917